Bonsall is a surname. Notable people with the surname include:

Sir Arthur Bonsall (1917–2014), British intelligence officer
Brian Bonsall (born 1981), American actor
Crosby Bonsall (1921–1995), American artist and children's book author and illustrator
Elizabeth Fearne Bonsall (1861–1956), American painter and illustrator
Frank Bonsall (1920–2011), British mathematician
I. H. Bonsall (1833–1909), early American photographer
Joe Bonsall (born 1948), American singer
William Hartshorn Bonsall (1846–1905), Californian businessman and politician
Will Bonsall (born 1950s), American author, seed saver and farmer

See also
Peter Bonsall-Boone AM (1938–2017), Australian LGBT rights activist
Bonsal (disambiguation)